Buchetium or Bouchetion, or Buchaetium or Bouchaition (Βουχαίτιον), or Buchetum or Boucheton (Βουχετόν), or Bucheta or Boucheta (Βούχετα), was a city of the Cassopaei in ancient Thesprotia, a little above the sea.

According to the legend it got its name because Themis went there, mounted on an ox, during the flood of Deukalion.

Its site was occupied by the medieval settlement of Rogoi, near modern Nea Kerasounta.

References

Populated places in ancient Epirus
Former populated places in Greece
Cities in ancient Epirus
Elean colonies